Gem Diamonds is a British-based global diamond mining business. It is headquartered in London and is listed on the London Stock Exchange. In 2017, the company generated a profit of $20.8 million.

History
The business was founded by Clifford Elphick in July 2005.

The company acquired Letšeng diamond mine in 2006, and has since found five of the 20 largest known white gem quality diamonds, elevating the mine to the highest dollar-per-carat kimberlite diamond operation in the world.

The company was first listed on the London Stock Exchange in 2007.

In 2007, the company began diamond prospecting on traditional Bushmen lands in Botswana. Survival International alleged that the company had not carried out sufficient consultation with the Bushmen, many of whom have been forced from their homes.

Construction of the first phase of a mine, Ghaghoo, located 45 km within the Eastern border of the Central Kalahari Game Reserve began in 2011. It is a controversial matter as the government of Botswana has allowed for mining exploration and construction within a game reserve originally intended for the Bushmen and the wildlife they subsist on. While one cannot directly prove the government's intentions, a year before this exploration began the government started the forced removal of the Bushmen from their lands.

Significant gem discoveries

In January 2018, a larger stone was discovered at Letseng, measuring  — the fifth-largest gem-quality diamond ever found. Named the Lesotho Legend, the gem sold in Antwerp, Belgium to Samir Gems on 12 March 2018 for $40 million.

Several of Gem Diamond's significant finds in Lesotho have been purchased by Graff Diamonds.

Operations
The Company has mines in the following locations:
 Botswana
 Lesotho

See also 
Rockwell Diamonds
 List of companies based in London

References

External links
 Official site

Non-renewable resource companies established in 2005
Diamond mining companies
Companies based in the City of Westminster
British companies established in 2005